Shi Jiaonai (29 November 1920 – 24 November 2018) was a Chinese plant physiologist. He was a member of the China Democratic League (Minmeng).

Biography
Shi was born in Jinjiang, Fujian, on November 29, 1920 and moved to the Philippines when he was 10. He returned to China in 1940. In 1944 he graduated from Zhejiang University, where he majored in botany.

In 1991 he was elected as a member of the Chinese Academy of Sciences. He was a researcher at the Shanghai Institutes for Biological Sciences before his death in November 2018.

Awards
 1987 Second Prize for Scientific and Technological Progress, Chinese Academy of Sciences
 2000 Ho Leung Ho Lee Foundation
 1989 Excellent Returned Overseas Chinese Intellectuals in China

References

1920 births
2018 deaths
Biologists from Fujian
20th-century Chinese botanists
Chinese physiologists
Hokkien scientists
Members of the Chinese Academy of Sciences
People from Jinjiang, Fujian
Physicians from Fujian
Plant physiologists
Zhejiang University alumni
Scientists from Fujian
Chinese expatriates in the Philippines